What's Up Superdoc! is a 1978 British sex comedy film, directed by Derek Ford and starring Harry H. Corbett, Christopher Mitchell, Melvyn Hayes, Julia Goodman, Hughie Green, Bill Pertwee, Angela Grant, Chic Murray, Beth Porter and Sheila Steafel. It was produced by Michael L. Green. It was a sequel to the 1977 film What's Up Nurse!, with Mitchell replacing Nicholas Field as the oversexed Dr. Todd. Sex film star Mary Millington makes a brief appearance.

Cast
 Harry H. Corbett as Goodwin
 Christopher Mitchell as Dr. Todd
 Melvyn Hayes as Waiter / Pietro
 Julia Goodman as Annabel
 Hughie Green as Bob Scratchitt
 Bill Pertwee as Woodie
 Angela Grant as Kim
 Chic Murray as Bernie
 Beth Porter as Melanie
 Sheila Steafel as Dr. Pitt
 Marianne Stone as Dr. Maconachie
 Milton Reid as Louie

References

External links
 

1978 films
1970s English-language films
British sexploitation films
British sex comedy films
1970s sex comedy films
1978 comedy films
Films directed by Derek Ford
1970s British films